

This is intended to be a complete list of the properties and districts on the National Register of Historic Places in Jefferson County, Alabama, United States. Latitude and longitude coordinates are provided for many National Register properties and districts; these locations may be seen together in an online map.

There are 172 properties and districts listed on the National Register in the county, including 3 National Historic Landmarks. 146 of these sites, including all of the National Historic Landmarks, are located in Birmingham, and are listed separately; another 27 sites are listed here. One district, the Red Mountain Suburbs Historic District, includes contributing properties located in the city of Birmingham and in adjacent parts of Jefferson County.

Current listings

Birmingham

Outside Birmingham

|}

See also

 List of National Historic Landmarks in Alabama
 National Register of Historic Places listings in Alabama

References

 
Jefferson